The Government of the Grand National Assembly, self-identified as the State of Turkey or Turkey, commonly known as the Ankara Government, or archaically Angora Government, was the provisional and revolutionary Turkish government based in Ankara (then known as Angora) during the Turkish War of Independence (1919–1923) and during the final years of the Ottoman Empire. It was led by the Turkish National Movement, as opposed to the crumbling Constantinople Government, which was led by the Ottoman Sultan.

During the War of Independence, the Government of the Grand National Assembly commanded the army known as Kuva-yi Milliye ("National Forces"). After the war and victory over the monarchist Constantinople Government, the republican Ankara Government declared the end of the Ottoman Empire and the creation of the Republic of Turkey from its ashes in 1923. The Grand National Assembly is today the parliamentary body of Turkey.

Background

At the time the Ankara Government was proclaimed, there existed another Turkish government in the Allied-occupied Constantinople (now Istanbul), namely the Imperial Ottoman Government, often known as the "Constantinople Government" (as opposed to the nationalist Ankara Government). Once the Grand National Assembly was established, on 23 April 1920, without rejecting at first the legitimacy of the Ottoman Sultanate, the new parliament in Ankara formed its own government within the Assembly. The Ministers were called "Vekil" (Acting) instead of the conventional "Nazır", to keep with the provisional nature of the government.

The Ankara Government was founded to represent Turkey because the de jure capital, Constantinople, was under occupation. The president of the GNA (renamed the Grand National Assembly of Turkey after 8 February 1921) and later of the Republic of Turkey, was Mustafa Kemal Pasha. Once the Armistice of Mudanya was signed, replacing the Armistice of Mundros (signed by the Ottoman Empire in 1918 at the end of World War I) and ending the Turkish War of Independence, the GNA abolished the imperial Sultanate, which was accused of collaborating with the Allies during the occupation of Turkey.

The Constantinople Government, representing the Ottoman sultanate and the old imperial and monarchical order, initially refused to recognize the Turkish national movement and the Government of the Grand National Assembly in Ankara, holding that it alone was the legitimate government of the Ottoman Empire. It attempted to militarily defeat the Ankara Government using its Kuva-yi Inzibatiye, i.e. the "Forces of Order", commonly known as the "Army of the Caliphate" (as opposed to the GNA's forces, the Kuva-yi Milliye, the "Army of the Nation"), but failed to do so. In 1921, diplomatic teams from both the monarchist Constantinople Government and the republican Ankara Government appeared at the Conference of London. In a surprising move, however, the Ottoman diplomatic team led by Ahmet Tevfik Pasha gave in and allowed the Turkish diplomatic team led by Bekir Sami Kunduh to be the sole representatives of the country at the conference. The Treaty of Lausanne was signed on 24 July 1923, between the representatives of the Allies and of Ankara, thus officially recognizing the government of Ankara as the legitimate Turkish government.

On 29 October, the Republic of Turkey was proclaimed by the Grand National Assembly of Turkey.

The governments
The governments prior to the Republic were used to be called "Executive ministers of Turkey." They were: 
1st cabinet of the Executive Ministers of Turkey
2nd cabinet of the Executive Ministers of Turkey
3rd cabinet of the Executive Ministers of Turkey
4th cabinet of the Executive Ministers of Turkey
5th cabinet of the Executive Ministers of Turkey

See also
 Turkish National Movement
 Armistice of Mudanya
 Turkish War of Independence
 Abolition of the Ottoman sultanate

References

External links
 History of the Grand National Assembly 

States and territories established in 1920
States and territories disestablished in 1923
Angora vilayet
Turkish War of Independence
1920 in the Ottoman Empire
1921 in the Ottoman Empire
1922 in the Ottoman Empire
1923 in Turkey
Provisional governments